Adamovo may refer to:
Adamovo, Russia, several rural localities in Russia
Adamovo, Slovenia, a settlement in the Municipality of Velike Lašče, Slovenia
 Adamovo, Republic of Buryatia

See also
 Adamowo (disambiguation)
 Adamovsky (disambiguation)
 Adamov (disambiguation)